Astro Oasis is a Malaysian television station owned and operated by Astro. The channel broadcasts Islamic-related programmes. Its highest rated program is the reality TV series, Imam Muda.

Astro Oasis is currently available for free-to-view on Astro and NJOI in Malaysia on Channel 106 (HD).

Dramas
 Bila Hati Telah Hitam
 Mail Dan Sudin Sambut Ramadan
 Tanah Kubur
 Insya Allah Ada Jalan (Indonesia)

Variety shows
 Salam Muslim
 Mimbar Pencetus Ummah S2 (also aired on Astro Prima and Astro Maya HD)
 Kalau Dah Jodoh... Ustaz Kazim Elias S2
 Jom Kongsi Bersama DMFK
 Taqwa
 Syamail: Kesempurnaan Rasulullah SAW
 Jejak Rasul
 Formula Anggun
 Arena Global
 Ar-Rayyan
 Hijrah Remaja
 Riwayat Kamil
 Halal BIO
 Forum Perdana
 Imam Muda
 Indahnya Iman
 Trek Global
 Cinta Madinah

Sinetrons
 Keagungan Tuhan
 Al-Kautsar
 Kubersimpuh KepadaMu
 Pesantren Cinta
 Hafizah
 Sulaiman (Indonesia)

Animated and Kids
 Omar & Hana (Also aired on Astro Ceria and Astro Prima)

References

External links

 Astro Oasis TV Guide

Astro Malaysia Holdings television channels
Television channels and stations established in 2007
Islamic television networks